Spencer William Pratt (born August 14, 1983) is an American reality television personality. In 2007, he began dating Heidi Montag, a primary cast member of the reality television series The Hills. Subsequently, he came to prominence after being cast in the series. Their relationship ultimately ended Montag's friendship with fellow cast member Lauren Conrad. The ensuing feud among the three became the central focus of the series, and was carried through each subsequent season.

The couple, collectively nicknamed "Speidi", married in April 2009. Later that year, they made controversial appearances on the second season of the American version of I'm a Celebrity...Get Me Out of Here! In 2013, Montag and Pratt competed as a single entity on the eleventh series of the British version of Celebrity Big Brother, and returned to compete as a single entity on the nineteenth series in 2017. Pratt formerly appeared on Wife Swap and The Spyson Hour, a weekly segment on the reality TV podcast Rob Has a Podcast.

Early life
Pratt was born August 14, 1983, in Los Angeles, California. He is the elder sibling of Stephanie, also a television personality.
He attended the Crossroads School.

Reality television career

2005: The Princes of Malibu
Pratt first appeared on television in 2005 in the short-lived reality series The Princes of Malibu. As creator and executive producer of the series, Pratt acted in the role of "manager/publicist/agent/stylist" for series star Brody Jenner.

2007–2010: The Hills
In 2006, MTV developed the reality television series The Hills as the spin-off of Laguna Beach: The Real Orange County. It originally chronicled the lives of Lauren Conrad, who appeared on its predecessor, her housemate Heidi Montag, and friends Audrina Patridge and Whitney Port. In 2007, Pratt began dating and later moved into an apartment with Montag, which led to the deterioration of her friendship with Conrad. During the third season, Conrad ended her friendship with Montag after she suspected that Pratt was responsible for rumors of a sex tape involving her and her former boyfriend Jason Wahler; the ensuing feud between the three carried through each subsequent season. After Conrad established companionships with Jenner and Frankie Delgado, he severed ties with both men.

In August, Montag entered the music industry and began recording her debut studio album. Later that month, the song "Body Language" was leaked on the internet, and featured a rapped verse from Pratt. He later directed the music video for Montag's first promotional single "Higher".

Later that year, Montag and Pratt appeared on the second season of the American version of I'm a Celebrity...Get Me Out of Here! in support of the "Feed the Children" foundation. They quit after Montag was hospitalized with a gastric ulcer and later created controversy after alleging that they were subject to torture during production. After leaving the series, Montag and Pratt became notorious for their antics and antagonistic roles, notably during an interview with Al Roker of Today, and were described as "everything that's wrong with America". In May 2010, Pratt and Montag made their final appearance on The Hills halfway through the sixth and final season. In 2009, Spencer and Heidi appeared at the How I Met Your Mother episode "Benefits" as themselves.

In July, Montag filed for divorce from Pratt, citing irreconcilable differences in the petition. However, they called it off in September after confessing that the action was intended to boost Montag's ailing career. In November, they renewed their vows in Carpinteria, California. Pratt was arrested and jailed in Costa Rica on September 11, 2010, while attempting to board an aircraft with hunting weapons. He was subsequently released and banned from re-entering the country.

Pratt's work on The Hills earned him the title of "Greatest Reality TV Villain" on Yahoo!'s fan-voted poll in 2015. Other nominees for this award included Juan Pablo Galavis, Omarosa Manigault, Will Kirby, and Russell Hantz.

2013–2014: Celebrity Big Brother UK
In January 2013, Montag and Pratt (as a single entity) competed as housemates on Celebrity Big Brother 11, where they notably developed a minor feud with singer and television personality Rylan Clark. They were named the runners-up, losing to Clark. On February 18, Channel 5 aired a one-off television special discussing Montag and Pratt's rise to prominence, titled Speidi: Scandal, Secrets & Surgery!.

TV Guide included him in its 2013 list of "The 60 Nastiest Villains of All Time."

The couple appeared in the E! Documentary special After Shock: Heidi & Spencer.

2015: Marriage Boot Camp and Partnership with Rob Has a Podcast
Pratt and Montag were houseguests on We TV's Marriage Boot Camp, as they worked out their differences about having children. While there, the couple met and became friends with Survivor winner Tyson Apostol and his girlfriend Rachel Foulger. When Marriage Boot Camp aired on television, Pratt and Apostol began hosting The Spyson Hour, a weekly podcast to recap the show, alongside Rob Cesternino of Rob Has a Podcast. After the season finished airing, Pratt, Apostol, and Cesternino continued The Spyson Hour, discussing Pratt's reality TV history and zany current events. Pratt left the show in October 2015.

2017: Return to Celebrity Big Brother UK
In 2017, Pratt re-entered the Celebrity Big Brother 19 with his wife. On day 18, the couple was eternally nominated by James Cosmo, which they did not have a good reaction to. They were saved in an eight-person eviction on day 22. However, they were evicted on day 25 against Kim Woodburn, Jessica Cunningham, Bianca Gascoigne and Jedward; after they finished in 9th place. Pratt and Montag were reunited with their rival, Rylan Clark-Neal, on Big Brother's Bit on the Side that night.

2018: Snapchatter of the Year 
Pratt developed a widespread fanbase on Snapchat by posting stories showing his family, daily life and his passion for hummingbirds. His popularity led to him being nominated in January 2018 for Snapchatter of the Year at the 10th Annual Shorty Awards, eventually winning the category.

2019: The Hills: New Beginnings
At the 2018 MTV Video Music Awards, MTV announced a reboot of The Hills entitled The Hills: New Beginnings, slated to premiere in 2019. Pratt was announced as part of the cast of the new series. 
The show followed the Pratts as they navigated running their business "Pratt Daddy Crystals" and wanting to expand their family. The show was cancelled after two seasons.

Personal life
In December 2013, Pratt completed his undergraduate degree in political science at the University of Southern California after ten years. Pratt had left his studies to pursue television projects and re-enrolled in 2011.

During the fourth season of The Hills, Montag and Pratt eloped in Mexico on November 20, 2008. A wedding ceremony was held on April 25, 2009, in Pasadena, California. Their son Gunner Stone was born on October 1, 2017. Their second son, Ryker Pratt, was born on November 17, 2022.

References

External links

1983 births
Living people
American socialites
Crossroads School alumni
Participants in American reality television series
People from Los Angeles
The Hills (TV series)
Shorty Award winners